Gladys Elena Maestre is a neuroscientist from Venezuela who is a professor at the University of Texas Rio Grande Valley School of Medicine. She is known for her work on Alzheimer's disease and other forms of dementia.

Education and career
Maestre has a B.S. from St. Vincent of Paul in the city of Maracaibo and in 1989 she was awarded an M.D. degree by the University of Zulia School of Medicine. She received an M.Phil (1995) and a Ph.D. (1996) from Columbia University. Maestre taught psychiatry and neurosciences from 1992 through 2014 at the University of Zulia. She served as director of the Neuroscience Laboratory of the Institute of Biological Research School of Medicine. As of 2022, Maestre is a professor of neurosciences and human genetics at the University of Texas Rio Grande Valley School of Medicine (UTRGV). She is also director of the UTRGV Alzheimer's Disease Resource Center for Research on Aging of Minorities, and directs the Maracaibo Aging Study, a community-based longitudinal study of age-related diseases.

Work 
Maestre's doctoral research focused on the influence of brain genetics on mental health and memory-based diseases, demonstrating that the presence of the Ԑ4 allele of the apolipoprotein gene is related to the risk of Alzheimer's disease. Maestre has led international initiatives to build capacity for research and services aimed at improving prevention and treatment of dementia and other age-related diseases in low-to-middle-income countries, Bolivia, Haiti, and Venezuela. In 2021, she was funded to work on Alzheimer's in the Rio Grande Valley which has a high rate of memory loss among seniors.

Awards and recognition
In 2000, Maestre received the Bruce S. Schoenberg Award for neuroepidemiology from the American Academy of Neurology. In 2018 she received the highest distinction for life in science from the Bolivian Institute of Cognitive Neuroscience. The University of Texas Rio Grande Valley awarded her with the 2019 excellence award for research.

Selected publications

References

External links 

Living people
Women neuroscientists
Venezuelan scientists
Alzheimer's disease researchers
Columbia University alumni
University of Zulia alumni
Academic staff of the University of Zulia
University of Texas Rio Grande Valley people
Year of birth missing (living people)